The 1997–98 OB I bajnokság season was the 61st season of the OB I bajnokság, the top level of ice hockey in Hungary. Four teams participated in the league, and Dunaferr Dunaujvaros won the championship.

Regular season

Final
 Dunaferr Dunaújváros - Alba Volán Székesfehérvár 3:1 (4:7, 4:1, 4:1, 4:3)

External links
 Season on hockeyarchives.info

OB I bajnoksag seasons
Hun
OB